Hợp Đức may refer to several places in Vietnam, including:

Hợp Đức, Haiphong, a ward of Đồ Sơn District
Hợp Đức, Bắc Giang, a commune of Tân Yên District
Hợp Đức, Hải Dương, a commune of Thanh Hà District